Kelly Smith (born 21 December 1995) is an English rugby union player.

Smith began playing rugby at age 10. She made her senior debut with the Worcester Valkyries before joining Gloucester-Hartpury Women in 2017.

Her debut with the England national team was at the 2018 Six Nations Championship where she played in England's last game. She also played at the 2019 Six Nations Championship which England won the Grand Slam. She scored two tries over four games. She was selected to play in the 2020 Women's Six Nations Championship which was postponed midway due to the COVID-19 pandemic.

In 2019, she was one of 28 players awarded a full-time contract with the English national team.

References

1995 births
Living people
England women's international rugby union players
English female rugby union players